Westfront 1918 is a German war film, set mostly in the trenches of the Western Front during World War I. It was directed in 1930 by G. W. Pabst, from a screenplay by Ladislaus Vajda based on the novel Vier von der Infanterie by Ernst Johannsen.  The film shows the effect of the war on a group of infantrymen portrayed by an ensemble cast led by screen veterans Fritz Kampers and Gustav Diessl.

The film bears a resemblance to its close contemporary All Quiet on the Western Front (1930), an American production, although it has a bleaker tone, consistent with Pabst's New Objectivity work through the late 1920s.  It was particularly pioneering in its early use of sound – it was Pabst's first "talkie" – in that Pabst managed to record live audio during complex tracking shots through the trenches.

Westfront 1918 was a critical success when it was released, although it was often shown in truncated form. With the rise of National Socialism, the German authorities quickly judged the film to be unsuitable for the public for its obvious pacifism and for its denunciation of war, which propaganda minister Joseph Goebbels labelled as "cowardly defeatism". Some shots from the film were used for scene-setting purposes in a 1937 BBC Television adaptation of the play Journey's End.

Plot
In 1918 in France during the last months of the First World War, four infantrymen – the Bavarian (Fritz Kampers), a young man known as 'the student' (Hans-Joachim Moebis), Karl (Gustav Diessl), and the lieutenant (Claus Clausen) – spend a few rest-days behind the front. The student falls in love with a French peasant girl, Yvette (Jackie Monnier). Back at the front, the four suffer again the everyday hardships of war: dirt, trenches and danger of death. The Bavarian, Karl and the lieutenant become trapped when part of the trench collapses and the Student digs them out. Later they are mistakenly fired upon by their own artillery due to a misjudgement of distance and are again saved by the Student, who as a messenger risks his life to relay instructions to the soldiers setting the firing range of the artillery.

Karl receives leave, returning to his starving home town and promptly catches his wife in bed with a butcher. Embittered and unreconciled, he returns to the front. In his absence, the student is stabbed in a melee; his body lying in the mud of a shell-hole, only one hand sticking out. An offensive by the Allies begins, supported by tanks, and a mass of French infantry breaks through the thin German lines. During the defensive battle against the French, Karl and the Bavarian are seriously wounded, covering the remaining members of the group. The lieutenant has a nervous breakdown and falls into insanity. Shouting "Hurrah" non-stop, he salutes a pile of corpses. He is admitted to the field hospital together with Karl and the Bavarian. While the lieutenant is being carried though the hospital, many injured soldiers can be seen. In a fever, Karl sees his wife again and dies with the words "We are all to blame!". He is covered up, but his hand is hanging out the side. A wounded Frenchman lying beside him takes the hand in his and says "comrades, not enemies". The final message "End" is displayed with a question mark.

Cast

 Fritz Kampers as The Bavarian
 Gustav Diessl as Karl
 Hans-Joachim Moebis as The Student
 Claus Clausen as The Lieutenant
 Jackie Monnier as Yvette
 Hanna Hoessrich as Karl's Wife
 Else Helle as Karl's Mother
 Carl Ballhaus as Journeyman butcher
 Vladimir Sokoloff as Purser

Reception

Contemporaneous reviews for Westfront 1918 were generally positive, according to film scholar Jan-Christopher Horak in a video interview accompanying the Criterion Collection release package. Alfred Kerr writing in the Berliner Tageblatt in 1930 said of it: "Apart from anything, everything I saw in the winter, a sound film these days was my most deeply felt: because he exposes the face of war for non-participants in the rudest. The impression drowned weeks, months. One should perform every New Year's Day, once each year beginning; in every village, in every school; ex officio by law. What are plays "  In the Frankfurter Zeitung in the same year, Siegfried Kracauer wrote: "The urge to truthful reproduction of horror that prevails here outgrown two scenes, already almost exceed the limit of the expressible. One: a single battle ends with an infantryman is nipped in the swamp in front of everyone. (The fact that you can still see protrude from the bubbling mud later a dead hand, is unnecessary sensationalism.) The other is the front military hospital in the church with the maimed, nurses and doctors who can barely operate their craft farther from exhaustion. It is as if medieval torture pictures come to life " 1930) in More recent reviews of the film, though generally positive, are more subdued. The review aggregator rotten tomatoes records 9/9 positive professional reviews, with the average score 7.9/10. Walter Goodman, in his review in The New York Times on 22 November 1987, compares the film unfavorably to Lewis Milestone's All Quiet in the Westfront, stating: "Although the German work ... isn't nearly as moving as "All Quiet", it has a power of its own... Pabst is especially good at giving a gritty documentary quality to the battle scenes; the pointless slaughter comes through. The movie is weaker when it focuses on individual soldiers. ... The truth of the movie is all in the trenches." J. Hoberman reviewed the film positively in The Village Voice on 10 May 2005,  writing "The always protean Pabst made a brilliant adjustment to sound."

 Home video 
The Criterion Collection releases the film in the 2014 2K digital restoration by Deutsche Kinemathek in Blu-ray and DVD formats.

See also
 List of German films 1919-1933

References
Notes

Bibliography
 Bandmmann, Christa and Hembus, Joe (1980) "Western Front 1918" in Classics of German sound film. Munich: Goldmann. pp. 19–21, 

Further reading
 Hissnauer, Christian (2006) Western Front 1918 - Four of the infantry in  Klein, Thomas; Stiglegger, Marcus and Trotter, Rodo (eds.) Film genres: war film.. Stuttgart: Reclam. pp. 57–60 .
 Kagelmann, Andre and None, Reinhold (2014) "'Casually starts death, humans and animals to harvest' Considerations Ernst Johannsen's novel Four of the infantry and G. W. Pabst's film Westfront 1918" in Ernst Johannsen: Four of the Infantry, Their last days on the Western Front in 1918. Kassel: Media Usage Edition. pp. 80–113. 
 Mückenberger, Christiane (1883) Western Front 1918 in Dahlke, Günther and Karl, Günther (ed.) German Feature Films from the Beginnings to 1933. A Film Leader. (2nd edition) Berlin: Henschel Verlag. pp. 221 ff.

External links

 
 
 
 
 Senses of Cinema Article on the film
 Jeremy Arnold on the film, for Turner Classic Movies
Westfront 1918: War Is Hell an essay by Lucy Sante at the Criterion Collection

1930 films
1930s war drama films
1930s historical films
Anti-war films about World War I
Films of the Weimar Republic
Films directed by G. W. Pabst
German black-and-white films
German war drama films
Transitional sound films
Western Front (World War I) films
1930 drama films
1930s German films